Willy Schlobach (Brussels, 27 August 1864 – Nonnenhorn, 1951) was a German-Belgian painter.  In 1884, he was one of the founders of Les XX, a group of artists known for their hazy atmospheric paintings.
In 1887 he went to London where he spent a few years. He described the London night life and by the end of the 1880s his work was increasingly characterized by neo-impressionistic influences, but after 1894 he returned to his earlier impressionist style.

While he spent his youth in Belgium, both his parents and wife were German. During his "Belgian" period, he befriended the Belgian painters James Ensor and Willy Finch when all three attended the Académie Royale des Beaux-Arts in Brussels.  This period came to an end soon after Germany invaded Belgium during the onset of World War I as his pro-German sympathies clashed with the rising anti-German sentiment. He then moved to Germany, where he remained until his death in 1951.

1864 births
1951 deaths
19th-century German painters
19th-century German male artists
German male painters
20th-century German painters
20th-century German male artists
Belgian painters